Linhe is the only district and the seat of the city of Baynnur, Inner Mongolia, situated at the northern loop of the Yellow River, south of the Lang Shan range ( south-east of the Huhebashige). The district spans an area of 2,333 square kilometers, and has a population of 555,000 inhabitants as of 2019.

History 
The area of present-day Linhe was first incorporated under Emperor Wu of the Han Dynasty in 127 BCE, and appears by name in Volume 28 of the Book of Han.

The area remained sparsely inhabited before the late Ming Dynasty, when an exodus of people from fleeing famine in other provinces, such as Shanxi, Shaanxi, and Shandong, established new agricultural ventures in Linhe.

Linhe County was established in 1925.

The county was taken by Communist forces on September 19, 1949.

Linhe was upgraded to a county-level city on November 22, 1984.

On August 26, 2004, Linhe was changed from a county-level city to a district.

Climate 
On average, the district receives 3,254 hours of sunlight annually, has an annual temperature of 6.8 °C, and experiences 140 frost-free days per year.

Administrative divisions 
Linhe District is divided into 11 subdistricts, 7 towns, 2 townships, and 2 township-level farms.

Subdistricts 
The district's 11 subdistricts are as follows:

Towns 
The district's 7 towns are as follows:

 
 Xinhua

Townships 
The district's 2 townships are as follows:

Township-level farms 
The district has 2 farms which operate at the same level as township-level divisions, they are as follows:

 Langshan Farm

Economy 
In 2019, the district's GDP was 29.71 billion Yuan, retail sales totaled, 14.51 billion Yuan, disposable income reached 33,757 Yuan for urban residents and 20,249 Yuan for rural residents.

Transportation
Linhe lies at the junction the Baotou–Lanzhou and the Linhe–Ceke Railways.

Major expressways which pass through Linhe district include National Highway 110, the G6 Beijing–Lhasa Expressway, and the G7 Beijing–Ürümqi Expressway.

References 

County-level divisions of Inner Mongolia
Bayannur